The 2022 Race of Champions was the 31st running of the Race of Champions. It took place on 5–6 February 2022 at Pite Havsbad in Piteå, Sweden, 60 miles south of the Arctic Circle.

Participants

Nations Cup

Celebrity Race
All participants use Porsche 718 Cayman GT4 Clubsport.

Winners

Draw

Drivers
The Champion of Champions winner was decided by a knockout tournament, split into two halves - one (upper half) consisting of international racing drivers with the other being the rally experts and 'those with more experience of off-road driving'. The preliminary rounds and 1/8 finals were decided by a single heat, with the Quarter-finals being decided by 2 heats, the best overall time as a tie-breaker. The Semi-finals were the best of 3 heats, and the Final was the best of 5.

Preliminary Round

Main Draw 

 
 
 
 
 Sources: ROC Article  Official Video

Nations
The Nations' Cup was also decided in a knockout format, with each race being decided by 4 heats, with each driver racing against both drivers from the other team. If the match ended 2-2, the total race time was considered to decide a winner. The final round was a simple best-of-five match, with the winner crowned after reaching 3 heat wins.

Preliminary Round

Main Draw 

 
 
 
 
 Sources: ROC article, official video

Cars

References

External links
 

Race of Champions
Race of Champions
Race of Champions
Race of Champions
International sports competitions hosted by Sweden